Wangaratta is a city in the northeast of Victoria, Australia,   from Melbourne along the Hume Highway. The city had a population of 29,808 per the 2021 Australian Census.

The city is located at the junction of the Ovens and King rivers, which drain the northwestern slopes of the Victorian Alps. Wangaratta is the administrative centre and the most populous city in the Rural City of Wangaratta local government area.

History
The original inhabitants of the area were the Pangerang peoples (Pallanganmiddang, WayWurru, Waveroo).

The first European explorers to pass through the Wangaratta area were Hume and Hovell (1824) who named the Oxley Plains immediately south of Wangaratta. Major Thomas Mitchell during his 1836 expedition made a favourable report of its potential as grazing pasture. The first squatter to arrive was Thomas Rattray in 1838 who built a hut (on the site of the Wangaratta RSL) founding a settlement known as "Ovens Crossing".

The Post Office in the area opened on 1 February 1843 as Ovens. The Ovens office, and the Kilmore office which opened the same day, were the fifth and sixth to open in the Port Phillip District and the first two inland offices.

The name Wangaratta was given by colonial surveyor Thomas Wedge in 1848 after the "Wangaratta" cattle station, the name of which is believed to have been derived from an indigenous language and meaning "nesting place of cormorants" or "meeting of the waters". The first land sales occurred shortly afterward and the population at the time was around 200. The first school was established by William Bindall on Chisholm Street with 17 students.

Gold was found nearby at Beechworth in February 1852 and by the end of the year more than 8,000 prospectors rushed the fields of Ovens and Beechworth.  Wangaratta became a major service centre to these goldfields. As a result, the first bridge over the Ovens was completed in early 1855.  
 
A seven-member council incorporated the Borough of Wangaratta on 19 June 1863.

The 1870s saw the settlement establish a number of key infrastructure and services including the first water supply. Wangaratta hospital was opened in 1871 and the fire brigade was established in 1872.  The railway to Melbourne was opened on 28 October 1873.

On 28 June 1880 in the nearby small town of Glenrowan, located some 10 km away, the final shootout that led to the capture of Australia's most famous bushranger, Ned Kelly occurred.

In 1884, the railway was connected through to Sydney.

The population at the turn of the century reached 2,500 and the centre had developed an imposing streetscape of hotels, commercial public and religious buildings.

The Duke of Gloucester visited Wangaratta during his tour of Australia in 1934.

Bruck textile mills was established in 1946, employing over a thousand workers.

Wangaratta was proclaimed a city on April 12, 1959 with a population of 12,000 people.  New municipal offices were opened in 1980 which became the headquarters of the Rural City of Wangaratta after the amalgamation of municipalities in 1995.

Population
According to the 2021 census of Population, there were 29,808 people in Wangaratta.
 Aboriginal and Torres Strait Islander people made up 1.9% of the population. 
 84.6% of people were born in Australia. The next most common countries of birth were England 1.9%, Italy 1.0% and New Zealand 0.7%.   
 89.0% of people spoke only English at home. Other languages spoken at home included Italian at 1.4%. 
 The most common responses for religion were No Religion 41.7%, Catholic 23.6% and Anglican 12.0%.

Geography and landmarks
The geographical layout of the city is unusual in that the business district is located at the north-eastern extremity of the urban area, with outlying suburbs extending only to the south and west. The reason for this arrangement is that the area beyond the rivers, to the north and east of the business district, was until the 1990s prone to flooding and so unsuitable for building. Levees were constructed in the 1990s to alleviate the flooding, however development in this area has been slow.

Notable buildings include the Holy Trinity Anglican Cathedral and its Cathedral Close, St. Patrick's Catholic Church and the eccentric art déco courthouse.

Climate
Since the warmest month mean reaches , Wangaratta would have a humid subtropical climate (Cfa in the Köppen climate classification). Despite its Köppen classification, Wangaratta is firmly in the Australian Temperate Zone and nowhere close to the Subtropics; and on no account is it 'humid'. April is the driest month; July is the wettest. Sleet falls occasionally, but settled snowfalls are a very rare occurrence.

Rain falls as thunderstorms in the summer, and in winter with cold fronts. Occasional severe heat waves are caused by hot, dry air from the central deserts of Australia moving over the area. Wangaratta has significantly cooler nights than Albury (especially in summer), due in part to its western longitude exposing it to cold airmasses off the Southern Ocean. The city gets 105.1 clear days annually, which is akin to Sydney and Wollongong, however the distribution is wildly different; Wangaratta having much sunnier summers and autumns, but the inverse for winter and spring.

Rainfall averages out to  a year, most of which falls in winter with passing frontal systems; however these can occur at any time of year, and the main form of rainfall in spring and summer is from thunderstorms.

Governance

In local government, the Wangaratta region is covered by the Rural City of Wangaratta. The council was created in 1994 as an amalgamation of a number of other municipalities in the region with the council chambers located at the Government Centre in central Wangaratta. The city is represented by seven councillors elected once every four years by postal voting. The mayor is elected from these councillors by their colleagues for a one-year term.

In September 2013 the council was sacked by the state government. Victorian Local Government Minister Jeanette Powell said this was because "Council has failed to provide effective leadership and service for the community". The council will be replaced by an administrator who will serve until the 2016 local government elections.

In state politics, Wangaratta is located in the Legislative Assembly district of Ovens Valley currently held by the National Party of Australia.

In federal politics, Wangaratta is located in a single House of Representatives division—the Division of Indi. The Division of Indi was seen as a safe Liberal Party of Australia seat from 1977 until 2013, when the sitting member, Sophie Mirabella was defeated by independent candidate Cathy McGowan.

Industry
There is a considerable wine and gourmet food industry in the nearby Milawa and King Valley region. Other notable industries in the area include Australian Textile Mills formerly Bruck Textiles, Wilson Fabrics that now occupies the old IBM facility, Merriwa Industries and Australian Country Spinners.

Previously multi-national IBM manufactured computers in Wangaratta.

Culture and sport

Sport

Australian rules football, cricket and Netball are the most popular sports

There are four Australian rules football clubs in Wangaratta.

The Wangaratta Football Club, the Wangaratta Rovers Football Club, both competing in the Ovens and Murray Football League, and the North Wangaratta Football Club, which competes in the Ovens and King Football League. The close proximity of the Rovers and Wangaratta grounds reflects the historical sectarian split in membership of the clubs; Rovers membership being predominantly Catholic and Wangaratta being predominantly Protestant.

The city hosted several games for the 2005 Australian Football International Cup event, with several countries competing in the sport of Australian rules football. The event was played at the City Oval and Showgrounds and set the attendance records for the tournament to date.

Cricket in Wangaratta is organised by the Wangaratta and District Cricket Association. Clubs include City Colts, Wangaratta-Magpies & Rovers United Bruck.

Wangaratta City Football Club is a soccer club based at South Wangaratta Reserve. Founded in 1951, they compete in the Albury Wodonga Football Association.

Wangaratta Knights play rugby league in NRL Victoria. 

Wangaratta has a horse racing club, the Wangaratta Turf Club, which schedules around eleven race meetings a year including the Wangaratta Cup meeting in April.

The Wangaratta Greyhound Racing Club, which held regular meetings at the same venue, has been discontinued. Avian Park is no longer used.

Golfers play at the course of the Wangaratta Golf Club on Yarrawonga Road, or at the course of the Jubilee Golf Club at Wangandary nearby. A nine-hole course is at Boorhaman to the north of Wangaratta.

Between 1953 and 1956, the North Eastern Car Club ran motor racing meetings on the gravel and earth airstrip located on Wangarratta Common, south of the town centre. The circuit ran up and down the airstrip, with a loop at the western end.

The North East Windsport Club regularly sail "Land Yachts" called Blokarts (Blo-karts) at their sailing site at the nearby town of Springhurst, Victoria,

The city is home to the Northeast Bushrangers who play in the Big V basketball league. They play their home games at the Wangaratta YMCA.

Events
The main annual event is the Wangaratta Festival of Jazz, which attracts renowned international acts and has been attended by thousands each year since 1990. Ales on the Ovens Craft Beer Festival is another main attraction for the town.

Education
Wangaratta has three secondary schools: Galen Catholic College (private), Cathedral College (private) and Wangaratta High School which has three campuses.
Wangaratta has seven primary schools: Our Lady's Catholic Primary School, Appin Park Primary School, Wangaratta West Primary School, Yarrunga Primary School, St. Bernand's Primary School, St. Patrick's Primary School, and Wangaratta (Chisolm Street) Primary School

Wangaratta also has its own specialist school for people with disabilities, Wangaratta District Specialist School

The Goulburn Ovens Institute of TAFE has two Wangaratta campuses. The Docker street campus offers a broad range of courses from business studies to music with a central area containing a cafeteria, library and student services. The Christensens Lane campus on the outskirts of Wangaratta is the home for the National Centre for Equine Education as well as providing courses in horticulture.

In 2015 the Christensens Lane campus moved to a bigger site in Tone Road. And in 2016 Charles Sturt University also added a campus there. The old Christensens Lane campus was then dismantled to make way for a new housing estate.

Transport

Roads are the most used transport infrastructure in Wangaratta. The Hume Freeway (M31) bypasses the city to the south and east, while the C314 now forms the main road through it (as Murphy Street and Wangaratta Road). The city is located at the junction of several other major roads, the Great Alpine Road (B500), Wangaratta-Yarrawonga Road (C374), Wangaratta-Whitfield Road (C521) and Wangaratta-Kilfeera Road (C523).  A city bus service runs every half an hour during the day on weekdays and on Saturday mornings on a route covering Wangaratta's West End, the business district, Yarrunga and more recently, Yarrawonga Road.

Rail transport services both passengers and freight. Wangaratta railway station is on the North East railway line, the main railway line between Sydney and Melbourne. It is served by the Albury V/Line rail service thrice-daily as well as the NSW TrainLink XPT service twice-daily in both directions.

Historically, Wangaratta was the busy junction of several railway branch lines including; the broad gauge 5' 3"Yackandandah railway line, a narrow gauge 2' 6" Whitfield railway line and the broad gauge 5' 3" Bright and Beechworth railway line, all of which have since closed. Another short 5' 3" gauge branch line ran west to a wheat silo located on the north side of the Ovens River at Boorhaman. The current rail line through the town is the 4' 8" standard gauge rail opened in 1962.

The Murray to the Mountains Rail Trail is a shared cycling and walking track that follows the way of the former Bright railway line. The Hume Freeway runs directly next to Wangaratta.

Wangaratta is also serviced by a small regional airport, Wangaratta Airport.

Media

Radio Stations
FM
 87.6 MHz Orbit FM – Relay of Kiss FM
 88.0 MHz Vision Radio Network – Christian narrowcast
 99.3 MHz RSN Racing & Sport - Horse Racing narrowcast
 101.3 MHz Oak FM - Community
 102.1 MHz Edge FM - North East Broadcasters

AM
 756 kHz Radio National – ABC
 1566 kHz 3NE - North East Broadcasters

Some stations from nearby centres such as Albury-Wodonga and Shepparton can be heard across the region.

Notable residents and former residents
 Rebecca Allen (born 1992), Australian basketball player
 William Ah Ket, Chinese Australian barrister, 1876–1936
 Daniel Andrews, premier of Victoria 2014 – Current
 Sir John Bowser, premier of Victoria 1917–1918
 Alipate Carlile, Australian rules footballer with Port Adelaide
 Isobelle Carmody, author, born 1958
 Barrie Cassidy, political journalist, born in Wangaratta
 Nick Cave, popular musician
 Lloyd Crosbie, double murderer
 Greg Crump, 5x Paralympic Wheelchair Tennis Coach
 Anne Curtis, Filipina actress, singer, TV Host
 Sir Edward "Weary" Dunlop 1907–1993
 Simon Abney-Hastings, The Rt Hon. The 15th Earl of Loudoun (born 1974), an Australian who inherited a British peerage
 Belinda Hocking, Olympic backstroke swimmer, born 1990
 Steve Johnson, Australian rules footballer with Geelong
 Chris Naish, Former Australian rules footballer with Richmond and Port Adelaide
 Sophie Mirabella, member for Indi 2001–2013
 Nick Morris, Paralympic Champion men's wheelchair basketball Atlanta 1996
 Sebastian Pasquali, soccer player with Ajax and Melbourne Victory
 Mette-Marit, Crown Princess of Norway
 Darcy Vescio, Australian rules footballer with Carlton Football Club
 Ben Reid, Australian rules footballer with Collingwood
Sam Reid, Australian rules footballer with Sydney
 Quinton Tidswell, artist, died in Wangaratta in 1991
 George Turner, Science Fiction and Miles Franklin award-winning novelist
 Dean Woods, Olympic Champion cyclist Los Angeles 1984, Died in 2022
 Frederick William Wray, 1920 canon Holy Trinity Cathedral, 1928–1935 parish rector

Bibliography
 Larsen, Wal. The Mayday Hills Railway, Wal Larsen, Bright, 1976.
 O'Callaghan, Bill and Bill Findlay (1984). "Wangaratta, 1959–1984: A Silver City", City of Wangaratta.
 O'Brien, Antony. Shenanigans on the Ovens Goldfields: the 1859 Election, Artillery Publishing, 2005.
 Oberg, Leon. Railways of Australia, Reed, Sydney, 1975.
 Thompson, John E. Focus on Victoria's Narrow Gauge Whitfield Line, Puffing Billy Preservation Society, Belgrave, 2002.
 "Wangaratta: Capital of North Eastern Victoria", (1927) Committee of the Back to Wangaratta Celebrations.
 Whittaker, D. M. (1963). "Wangaratta: Being the History of the Township that sprang up at Ovens Crossing and grew into a modern City", Wangaratta City Council.
 Why Wangaratta, and Moments in Jazz (books on the Wangaratta Festival of Jazz and Blues).

Gallery

References 

Maps

 Dept of Minerals and Energy, Wangaratta, 8125, 1:100,000 (1971)(shows the district as it was in the 1960s with railways and before major sub-division redevelopments)

External links
 Rural City of Wangaratta Website

Cities in Victoria (Australia)
Rural City of Wangaratta